McKayla Rose Maroney (born December 9, 1995) is a retired American artistic gymnast and singer. She was a member of the American women's gymnastics team dubbed the Fierce Five at the 2012 Summer Olympics, where she won a gold medal in the team and an individual silver medal in the vault event. Maroney was also a member of the gold-winning American team at the 2011 World Championships, where she won gold medals in the team and vault competitions. She defended her World title and won the gold medal on vault at the 2013 World Championships, becoming the first U.S. female gymnast to defend a World Championship vault title.

A photograph of her with a "not impressed" expression, taken after winning silver in the 2012 Olympics, became an Internet meme. In 2016, she retired from competitive gymnastics.

Early life
McKayla Rose Maroney was born in Aliso Viejo, California, on December 9, 1995, the daughter of Erin and Mike Maroney (died 2019). Her father was a quarterback at Purdue University, and her mother was involved in figure skating and high school sports. McKayla is of Irish Catholic descent. She has two siblings, Tarynn and Kav, and was homeschooled in order to train as an elite gymnast.

Maroney said, "When I was younger, I would be watching Tarzan and running around on all fours. My mom was like, 'I need to put this child in gymnastics. She's crazy.' I was technically in gymnastics at the age of two and always felt comfortable in the gym." When she was nine years old, she started training at Gym-Max in Costa Mesa, California. In 2012, she said, "I realized that I had a dream that I wanted to go to the Olympics and I wanted to go as far as I could go. I thought I should probably move to a new gym and start thinking about the Olympics."

About her first Olympic memory, Maroney said, "I remember watching Carly Patterson. She was one of my favorites. I loved her floor routine. I went to Olympic Trials that year (2004) with Kyla [Ross]. I remember seeing the gymnasts on the floor and I loved all of their leotards. I thought they were so little and so amazing. I thought, how am I going to stay this little? I was worried that I was going to be really tall because my dad is 6'3" and my mom is 5'2", so I didn't know which one I was going to be."

Junior career

2009
In August, Maroney competed at the Visa Championships in Dallas, Texas.  She placed twenty-seventh in the all-around with a two-day combined score of 104.800 and third in the vault final with a score of 29.900. When asked about the first time she performed an Amanar in competition, Maroney said, "The first time I did it was at Visa Championships and I was just thirteen years old. I was just really little and I didn't really know what was going on.  But I just did it, and I was just very happy that I landed on my feet."

2010
In July, Maroney competed at the CoverGirl Classic in Chicago, Illinois.  She placed seventh in the all-around competition with a score of 55.650.

In August, Maroney competed at the Visa Championships in Hartford, Connecticut.  She placed third in the all-around competition with a two-day combined score of 113.250. In event finals, she placed first on vault scoring 32.000, seventh on balance beam scoring 27.850, and fourth on floor scoring 28.400.

In September, Maroney competed at the Pan American Championships in Guadalajara, Mexico.  She contributed a vault score of 15.933, a balance beam score of 13.866, and a floor score of 14.500 towards the American team's first-place finish.  In event finals, she placed first on vault with a score of 15.387 and first on floor with a score of 14.225.

Senior career

2011
In March, Maroney competed at the City of Jesolo Trophy in Jesolo, Italy.  She won the all-around competition with a score of 57.850.

In July, Maroney competed at the CoverGirl Classic in Chicago, Illinois. She placed sixth on balance beam scoring 14.550 and fifth on floor scoring 13.450.

In August, Maroney competed at the Visa Championships in Saint Paul, Minnesota. She placed second in the all-around competition with a two-day combined score of 115.150. In event finals, she placed first on vault scoring 30.700, seventh on balance beam scoring 27.650, and fifth on floor scoring 28.150.

In October, Maroney competed at the 2011 World Artistic Gymnastics Championships in Tokyo, Japan.  She contributed a vault score of 16.033 and a floor score of 14.566 towards the American team's first-place finish. Maroney won the vault final with a score of 15.300. She told International Gymnast Magazine, "For every competition, I just went in there with confidence in myself and in my team, and each day it felt like I gained more and more experience."

Early 2012

Maroney upgraded her second vault to a round-off, half-on, full-twisting front layout. "I've done it at two [U.S. team training] camps so far, and it's going pretty well," Maroney said. Her first vault remained an Amanar.

In March, Maroney competed at the City of Jesolo Trophy in Jesolo, Italy.  She placed fourth in the all-around competition with a score of 57.950.

In May, Maroney competed at the Secret U.S. Classic in Chicago, Illinois.  She placed first on vault with a score of 16.100 and tenth on balance beam with a score of 13.800.

In June, Maroney competed at the Visa Championships in St. Louis, Missouri. After the first day of competition, she was placed seventh in the all-around with a score of 58.700. During warmups for the second day of competition, she fell on a tumbling pass on floor landing on her back. Maroney was taken to the hospital and diagnosed with a minor concussion and nasal fracture. She took a week off from training and successfully petitioned to compete at the Olympic Trials.

At the beginning of July, Maroney competed at the Olympic Trials in San Jose, California. After the first day of competition, she said, "I'm thankful that I'm even here. I knew I had to hit vault because it's the most important event for me to make the Olympic team." Though she had falls on both bars and beam on day one, and a major loss of formation on bars during day two, she placed seventh in the all-around with a two-day combined score of 117.650. In event finals, she placed first on vault scoring 31.700 and fifth on floor scoring 29.700. Afterwards, Maroney was chosen as a member of the team that was sent to the 2012 Summer Olympics.  She said, "This is the best feeling – it's just so amazing. I'm in shock right now. I think this will be the happiest I'll ever be in my life.  It's the absolute best feeling knowing that I trained so hard for this and all the hard things that I have accomplished and now to be on this team.  These girls are my best friends.  My team mate Kyla Ross, we have been best friends since we were six years old so it's just absolutely amazing to be going to the Olympics."  When asked about feeling pressure to win gold on vault at the Olympics, she replied, "If I do my job I know I can get the gold medal.  That's what they picked me to be on the team for, so I need to be confident about that."

Maroney was featured on the cover of Sports Illustrated with the rest of the USA Women's Olympic Gymnastics team on the July 18, 2012, issue of "Olympic Preview". This marked the first time an entire Olympic gymnastics team had been featured on the cover of Sports Illustrated.

London Olympics
At the end of July, Maroney competed at the 2012 Summer Olympics in London. During training, she aggravated a previous bone break in the big toe of her right foot but competed on vault, although she did not take part in the floor routine as she hoped. "Bad things happen, you just have to make the best of it," Maroney said. "It does hurt. It's broken. How is it not going to hurt? I just try to ignore it and I worked so hard to be here, I can ignore the pain for a little bit." In 2021, she claimed she broke her entire foot, and team doctor Larry Nassar lied to the coach about it. Nassar was later convicted of sexual assault after hundreds of women, including Maroney, accused him of sexual abuse. She helped the American team qualify in first place, and individually qualified in first place to the vault final with a score of 15.800.

Along with Jordyn Wieber, she is credited for changing the team's nickname from the "Fab Five" to the "Fierce Five". While on the bus to a training session, they decided to change the name because the "Fab Five" was in use by a basketball team associated with the University of Michigan as well as associated with the musical group Duran Duran. They searched for words starting with the letter 'F' to describe the team. The top choices were feisty and fierce. Maroney and Wieber opted for "fierce". They said it described their floor routines, and the rest of the team concurred.

In the team final, she contributed a vault score of 16.233 toward the American team's first-place finish, the highest score in the competition in any event. She also scored an execution average of 9.733, the highest execution score at an Olympics or world championship under the new scoring system for women's gymnastics. About the rest of the team final, Maroney said, "I just wanted them to do so well and I'm just so proud of them. I was screaming and yelling. That last event on floor was really exhilarating, but amazing at the same time. I don't think I will ever, ever forget that."

In the vault final, Maroney won a silver medal with a score of 15.083. She performed an Amanar for her first vault, but fell on her second. This fall ended her 33-vault hitting streak in competition. With the fall, Maroney came in second. She said, "I didn't get my full block, my hands didn't really touch the vault. I still walked out with a silver medal and I'm happy about that. I'll have to watch the video and figure out what happened. It's really sad I had to fall on that vault but I'm glad I won a silver medal. I know I can do better vaults but I also know I didn't deserve the gold medal because I fell on my second vault. It happens. It's gymnastics. You can't always be perfect. Sometimes, things don't go as planned."

"McKayla is not impressed"

After winning the silver medal in the vault finals, Maroney was photographed on the medal podium while giving a brief look of disappointment with her lips pursed to the side. The image became an Internet phenomenon sparked by a tumblr blog called "McKayla is not impressed". The image went viral after it was Photoshopped into various "impressive" places and situations, e.g. on top of the Great Wall of China and standing next to Usain Bolt. Maroney stated that she found the Internet meme "kinda funny". Maroney later poked fun at the meme on various occasions, including appearances on Late Show with David Letterman, The Colbert Report, Dancing with the Stars: All-Stars, Extra, and notably, after she and the rest of the U.S. Gymnastics team met United States President Barack Obama at the White House in November 2012. She and President Obama posed for a photo together, both making the same pursed-lips expression. The podium picture made the top spot on Yahoo's list of "Most Viral Photos" of 2012. Maroney starred in a 2021 Geico commercial playing-off her "not impressed" pose.

Post-Olympics
In September 2012, Maroney was injured during an uneven bars dismount while performing at the Kellogg's Tour of Gymnastics Champions in Ontario, California. An MRI revealed that she had fractured the tibia in her left leg. The injury occurred shortly before teammate Aly Raisman injured herself performing on the same bars. On September 13, 2012, Maroney had two screws inserted to repair the fractured left tibia. She wore an immobilizer to keep the leg straight until doctors determined that she was ready to resume limited walking and rebuilding range of motion. Maroney returned to The Kellogg's Tour on October 4, 2012, in Oklahoma City on light duty. She was seen during the finale wearing her leg and foot splints and also at the VIP Meet and Greet session after the event.

On January 12, 2013, Maroney served as one of the judges for the Miss America pageant.

She participated in the Thirty Seconds to Mars music video "Up in the Air".

In 2013, Maroney signed a sponsorship agreement with Adidas Gymnastics.

2013
In July 2013, Maroney made her return to gymnastics at the 2013 Secret U.S. Classic, where she placed first on vault with a score of 15.425 (15.600 + 15.250) and third on floor with a score of 14.350, posting the highest execution score on that apparatus. This was her first event since the 2012 London Olympics. In an interview after she finished, Maroney said she hoped to upgrade both her vaults by the 2016 Olympics, as well as her tumbling on floor.

At the P&G Championships in August, Maroney competed on vault and floor exercise. She won gold medals in both events.

On September 15, Maroney was one of four gymnasts named to the United States team for the 2013 World Artistic Gymnastics Championships in Antwerp, Belgium. She was originally put on the team to compete on only two events—vault and floor, her strongest ones—but was later named to compete as an all-around gymnast alongside Simone Biles and Kyla Ross after performing extremely well during podium trainings. Teammate Brenna Dowell was named as an alternate instead, as there could only be three gymnasts competing on each event. She scored a total all-around score of 57.149, placing 6th overall, but due to the two-per-country rule, she could not compete in the all-around final or the floor final (14.333), or qualify as third reserve to the uneven bars final (14.3). On floor, Maroney would have qualified over teammate Kyla Ross but due to her music being over time by one second she incurred a 0.1 deduction, putting her in the 6th place with same score as Ross. Due to Maroney having lower execution, albeit having higher difficulty, Ross progressed to the final. In the vault final, she successfully defended her title, winning the gold medal with a score of 15.724. It was the last competitive routine of Maroney's career. She was the first American woman to ever defend a world title on vault.

2014–16: Injuries and retirement
In March 2014, Maroney underwent surgery on her knee. Maroney was featured on the cover of the April issue of Inside Gymnastics. In International Gymnast Magazine, she said that she wanted to upgrade both of her vaults.

On August 31, 2014, underage nude images of Maroney were published as part of the 2014 celebrity photo leaks.

In March 2015, Maroney claimed in a YouTube video that she struggled with adrenal fatigue following the 2013 World Championships.

On February 24, 2016, popular gymnastics podcast GymCastic released a candid 49-minute-long interview with Maroney regarding her health issues preceding and following the 2012 Olympic Games. In the interview, she announced her retirement from competitive gymnastics—this came two days after fellow Fierce Five teammate Kyla Ross' retirement.

Post-gymnastics career
In the summer of 2016, Maroney announced that she would be making a singing debut with a single named "Ghost".

2017–2019: Larry Nassar sexual abuse case

On October 18, 2017, Maroney alleged that the USA Gymnastics team physician Larry Nassar had repeatedly molested her, starting when she was 13 years old, until her retirement from the sport in 2016. She made the allegation on Twitter under the #MeToo hashtag. Nassar had been arrested in November 2016 and accused of sexually assaulting female minors throughout his career.  

In December 2017, Maroney filed a suit against Nassar, Michigan State University, the United States Olympic Committee and USA Gymnastics accusing the latter two of covering up the sexual abuse by asking Maroney to sign a $1.25 million confidentiality agreement. Maroney agreed and accepted the money. During Nassar's sentencing hearing, USA Gymnastics waived the agreement, at least temporarily, to allow Maroney to make a victim's statement in court against Nassar, who is now serving a 40-to-175-year prison sentence.

On May 16, 2018, it was announced that Maroney and the other victims would be awarded the Arthur Ashe Courage Award.

2020: Music
On March 7, 2020, Maroney released her first official single "Wake Up Call", and released her second single "Covid Lockdown" a few weeks later.

Competitive history

Acting career
Maroney made her acting debut in the CW television series Hart of Dixie on November 20, 2012. She played Tonya, a friend of Rose in the episode "Baby, Don't Get Hooked on Me". That appearance turned into a recurring role, with Maroney appearing in six episodes of the series.

In December 2013, Maroney appeared on an episode of the Fox TV show Bones called "The Spark in the Park" (season 9), as a gymnast named Ellie who is a suspect in the murder of a fellow gymnast.

On August 19, 2016, Maroney appeared in season 2 episode 1 of the NBC TV show Superstore called "The Olympics" as herself in a number of candid appearances alongside fellow Olympians Tara Lipinski and Apolo Ohno. 

Maroney appeared in several GEICO television commercials in 2021.

Discography

Singles
"Wake Up Call" (2020)
"Covid Lockdown" (2020)

Filmography

Television

See also

Gymnastics at the 2012 Summer Olympics
United States at the 2012 Summer Olympics

References

External links

 
 
 
 
 
 

1995 births
21st-century American actresses
21st-century American singers
American female artistic gymnasts
American people of Irish descent
American television actresses
Catholics from California
Gymnasts at the 2012 Summer Olympics
Internet memes introduced in 2012
Living people
Medalists at the 2012 Summer Olympics
Medalists at the World Artistic Gymnastics Championships
Olympic gold medalists for the United States in gymnastics
Olympic silver medalists for the United States in gymnastics
People from Laguna Niguel, California
Sportspeople from Aliso Viejo, California
Sportspeople from California
U.S. women's national team gymnasts
World champion gymnasts